John Hanson is a bronze statue by Richard E. Brooks of John Hanson, installed in the United States Capitol, in Washington, D.C., as part of the National Statuary Hall Collection. It is one of two statues donated by the state of Maryland.

Though the statue is dated 1902 the work was unveiled on unveiled January 31, 1903 by Maryland Senator George Louis Wellington. The work depicts Hanson in Colonial era garb wearing a tricorn hat with a cane in his left hand.

References

External links
 

1903 establishments in Washington, D.C.
1903 sculptures
Bronze sculptures in Washington, D.C.
Monuments and memorials in Washington, D.C.
Hanson, John
Sculptures of men in Washington, D.C.
Statues of U.S. Founding Fathers